Hutchesson may refer to:

 Catherine Hutchesson, Australian politician
 Errol Hutchesson (born 1939), former Australian rules footballer
 Frank Hutchesson (1907–1969), former Australian rules footballer
 Tom Hutchesson, Australian rules footballer

See also 

 Hutchinson

Surnames